Steven Kenneth Chapman  (born 1959) is Vice-Chancellor of Edith Cowan University, Perth, Australia. Previously he was Principal and Vice-Chancellor of Heriot-Watt University, Edinburgh.

Early life
Steve Chapman was born on 12 May 1959 in South Shields, County Durham. Chapman studied at Newcastle University, where he received a First Class BSc (Hons) degree in Chemistry (1980) and completed a PhD in Chemistry (1983). Steve Chapman carried out his postdoctoral studies at the Massachusetts Institute of Technology on a NATO Research Fellowship from 1983 to 1985.

Career

Chapman returned to the UK in 1985 and was a Lecturer and then Senior Lecturer at the University of Edinburgh from 1985 to 1995, and Professor of Biological Chemistry from 1996. In 2000, he became Head of the University's School of Chemistry, and in August 2006, was appointed as Vice-Principal of Planning, Resources and Research Policy at the University. Externally, Chapman's roles have included the HEFCE TRAC(T) Steering Group, the Research and Knowledge Transfer Committee of the Scottish Funding Council, and as a representative on LERU and Universitas 21. He was a member of the Board of UCEA and was a previous member of the Board of Directors of Edinburgh Research and Innovation Limited. He has published over 200 research publications and in 2001 received the Royal Society of Chemistry Interdisciplinary Award for major contributions to science at the Chemistry/Biology interface. In 2005 Chapman became a Fellow of the Royal Society of Edinburgh and the Royal Society of Chemistry.

Chapman was appointed Commander of the Order of the British Empire (CBE) in the 2016 New Year Honours for services to higher education as Vice-Chancellor of Heriot-Watt.

References 

1959 births
People from South Shields
Academics of the University of Edinburgh
Fellows of the Royal Society of Edinburgh
Living people
Alumni of Newcastle University
Academics of Heriot-Watt University
Commanders of the Order of the British Empire
English expatriates in Australia
Academic staff of Edith Cowan University